Thomasville is an unincorporated community in Jackson Township of York County, Pennsylvania, United States, west of the city of York. The community is home to Martin's Potato Chips and York Airport.

Schools
The community is located within the Spring Grove Area School District   and administers the Paradise Elementary School with an enrollment of 355 students.

Transportation
The Lincoln Highway, U.S. Route 30, serves Thomasville. Thomasville is home to the privately owned, public-use York Airport which houses a STAT Medevac unit.

References

Unincorporated communities in York County, Pennsylvania
Unincorporated communities in Pennsylvania